Babkin is a Russian masculine surname, its feminine counterpart is Babkina. It may refer to
Boris Babkin (1877–1950), Russian-born physiologist
Elīna Babkina (born 1989), Latvian basketball player 
Kateryna Babkina (born 1985), Ukrainian writer
Konstantin Babkin (born 1971), Russian businessman and politician
Nadezhda Babkina (born 1950), Soviet and Russian folk and pop singer

See also
 10684 Babkina, a minor planet named after singer Nadezhda Babkina 

Russian-language surnames